Kirby Dach (born January 21, 2001) is a Canadian professional ice hockey centre who currently plays for the Montreal Canadiens of the National Hockey League (NHL). Dach was selected by the Chicago Blackhawks with the third overall pick in the 2019 NHL Entry Draft.

Playing career

Junior
During the 2016 Western Hockey League (WHL) Bantam Draft, Dach was selected second overall by the Saskatoon Blades. He played in 19 games, scoring 10 points. Dach joined the Blades full-time for the 2017–18 season. In 52 games, he recorded seven goals and 39 assists.

In January 2019, Dach was named as an alternate captain for the Blades for the remainder of the season. He was named captain for Team Orr for the CHL/NHL Top Prospects Game. Team Orr defeated Team Cherry 5–4, with Dach recording one assist. He finished the season with 25 goals and 48 assists in 62 games.

Dach was ranked third among North American skaters in NHL Central Scouting Services (CSS)' final draft rankings for the 2019 NHL Entry Draft; Dach was selected third overall by the Chicago Blackhawks. He signed his three-year, entry-level contract with the club on July 8.

Professional

Chicago Blackhawks (2019–2022)
Dach began his professional playing career immediately with the Blackhawks after training camp. He made his NHL debut on October 20, 2019, against the Washington Capitals. Dach scored his first NHL goal against Marc-André Fleury of the Vegas Golden Knights in a 2–1 loss on October 22. Dach finished the pandemic-shortened 2019–20 NHL season with 8 goals and 15 assists in 64 games. His point production was comparable to the two players picked ahead of him in the draft, Jack Hughes and Kaapo Kakko.

In the midst of the pandemic, the 2020 Stanley Cup playoffs were reorganized later in 2020, to be held in a bubble format in Edmonton and Toronto. Dach rejoined the Blackhawks for a qualifying round matchup with the Edmonton Oilers on their home ice, in which the Oilers, second in the Pacific Division at the close of the regular season, were considered the favourites. However, the Blackhawks staged an upset, ousting the Oilers three games to one in a best-of-five. Dach was widely credited as being one of the team's best players during the series, recording four assists in the first three games of the series. The Blackhawks advanced to the first round against the Golden Knights, and Dach scored his first career playoff goal on August 13. He became the sixth teenaged player to score a playoff goal for the Blackhawks, and the first to do so since Jeremy Roenick in 1989. The Blackhawks were ultimately eliminated by the Golden Knights in five games, while Dach finished the playoffs with one goal and five assists in nine games.

Dach missed much of the 2020–21 NHL season after sustaining a wrist injury in the 2021 World Junior Ice Hockey Championships. He rejoined the Blackhawks on March 27, 2021. Dach appeared in 18 games where he tallied two goals and eight assists. He reaggravated his wrist injury and missed the final three games of the season.

The 2021–22 season was a struggle for both Dach and the team, as he returned to the roster full-time but struggled to produce, in the midst of a disastrous season for the Blackhawks that saw wholesale management turnover. He managed only 9 goals and 17 assists in 70 games, while also struggling in the faceoff circle. Many observers considered it a poor sign that he was unable to generate offense despite high caliber linemates such as Alex DeBrincat and Patrick Kane, while also noting that the Blackhawks' organizational depth had likely "pushed Dach into a role he was not even close to ready for." With new general manager Kyle Davidson initiating a team rebuild, there were discussions of trading Dach elsewhere.

Montreal Canadiens (2022–present)
On July 7, 2022, during the 2022 NHL Entry Draft, Dach was traded by the Blackhawks to the Montreal Canadiens in exchange for the thirteenth overall pick and a third-round selection. The Canadiens had in turn traded defenceman Alexander Romanov to the New York Islanders to acquire the thirteen overall pick in order to make the trade, as general manager Kent Hughes said that he believed Dach could live up to his potential despite his struggles in preceding seasons.

On September 7, 2022, Dach signed a four-year, $13.45 million extension with the Canadiens. Dach scored his first goal for the team in overtime on October 17, giving them a 3–2 victory over the Pittsburgh Penguins. He said afterward that "I felt like I got a couple of opportunities in previous games to get my first one. But no better feeling than getting your first one on a new team at home." Though the Canadiens had initially acquired Dach to play centre position, after a few games he was experimentally moved to the wing on the top line with Nick Suzuki and Cole Caufield. The configuration garnered strong initial results. He credited new coach Martin St-Louis for having "allowed me to go out and have fun again, enjoy the game of hockey." In his first game back in Chicago following the trade, he scored the victory-clinching shootout goal against his former team, giving the Canadiens a 3–2 win. Dach was moved back to centre by midseason, following an injury to Sean Monahan.

International play
In 2018, Dach was named to Team Canada for the Hlinka Gretzky Cup where he scored 2 goals and 5 assists in 5 tournament games. In the gold medal game against Sweden, Dach scored a first period goal, helping Team Canada to a 6–2 victory.

He was loaned by the Blackhawks to Canada's 2021 World Junior Ice Hockey Championships roster, where he was eventually named captain. On December 23, in Canada's lone pre tournament game which was played against Team Russia, Dach bumped into Russian forward Ilya Safonov. The impact was enough to injure Dach, who left the game immediately and did not return. X-rays later confirmed Dach had sustained a fracture in his wrist, and would miss the rest of the tournament.

Personal life
Kirby's brother Colton Dach is an ice hockey forward with the Kelowna Rockets of the Western Hockey League as a prospect of the Chicago Blackhawks, who drafted him in the 2nd round of the 2021 NHL Entry Draft.  According to Colton, the biggest difference in their playing styles is that "(Kirby is) pass-first and I’m a shoot-first player.”

Career statistics

Regular season and playoffs

International

References

External links 

2001 births
Living people
Canadian ice hockey centres
Chicago Blackhawks draft picks
Chicago Blackhawks players
Montreal Canadiens players
Ice hockey people from Alberta
National Hockey League first-round draft picks
People from Fort Saskatchewan
Rockford IceHogs (AHL) players
Saskatoon Blades players